Golf at the 2011 Southeast Asian Games was held at Jagorawi Country Club, Bogor, Indonesia.

Medal summary

Men

Women

Medal table

External links
  2011 Southeast Asian Games

2011 Southeast Asian Games events
2011 Southeast Asian Games
2011
Southeast Asian Games